Geoff Doubleday (born 28 January 1940) is  a former Australian rules footballer who played with Fitzroy in the Victorian Football League (VFL).

Notes

External links 
		

Living people
1940 births
Australian rules footballers from New South Wales
Fitzroy Football Club players
North Albury Football Club players